David Collischon (19 July 1937 – 14 April 2016) was a British entrepreneur who, in 1980, bought the rights to the Filofax system and later floated his company on the stock market.

References

1937 births
2016 deaths
British chief executives
20th-century British businesspeople